Mixtape is a 2021 American comedy film directed by Valerie Weiss from a screenplay by Stacey Menear. It stars Gemma Brooke Allen, Nick Thune, and Julie Bowen.

Plot
Mixtape is set in Spokane, Washington in the last months of 1999.  Middle schooler Beverly Moody lives with her grandmother, Gail, a USPS mail carrier. They only have each other, as Beverly’s parents died in a car accident when she was two years old. Kim, her mother, was only 16 when she was born.

Talking about her daughter makes Gail sad, so she avoids Beverly's questions about her. She works extra shifts to keep busy and make money for Beverly’s college fund. Over-protective, Gail is fearful that she could lose Beverly like she lost Kim. Beverly is lonely, and is regularly bullied at school by two boys.

Beverly finds her parents’ mixtape “Love Riot,” but the tape ‘gets eaten’ by her Walkman and cannot be played. So, she’s on a mission to track down the songs from the mixtape to find out more about her parents. She hopes listening to the songs will make her feel connected to her parents, who were only a bit older than she is now when she was born.

The local record store is run by initially unfriendly Anti (as in anti-everything and everyone). But he is impressed with the list. When he asks “Vinyl or CD?”, her response is “I only have a Walkman.” He peers out the window, and she asks what he's looking for. He said, “A DeLorean with a flux capacitor”.

Anti agrees to put the first song on tape for her. He explains that on a mixtape, the order of songs is crucial, as well as the time between them and other details, “a message from the maker". So, he records for her the first song on the list, “Getting Nowhere Fast,” by Girls at Our Best. She will also have to find more, in the order they appeared on the mixtape, including “Linda Linda” by the Blue Hearts, “I Got a Right” by the Stooges, and “Teacher’s Pet” by The Quick.

In the search for the songs, Beverly makes friends along the way, like her neighbor Ellen, who's new in town, as she's Asian in case she can translate “Linda Linda”. It turns out that Ellen is actually Taiwanese. Tough girl classmate Nicky gets interested when they bond over shared interest in music, as Beverly recites the Cheap Trick song Surrender in their English class. Ellen’s ultra-strict mother and pesky younger brother contrast with Nicky’s father (Nicky’s encouraged to fight with her older brother to toughen her up, and is free to dress however).

The girls' developing friendship includes creating music with Nicky's brother's band's instruments, inspired by the mixtape, a delightful expedition to a magical abandoned place Beverly's parents had their first date to More than This. They track down a musician Kim knew, and pressure Anti to bring them to his gig. Afterwards, Beverly shows him a polaroid of him with Kim. Initially he doesn't bother to really look, but when he does he remembers she was a great lyricist. Then he dismisses her as a loser for having a baby and abandoning music.

Upset, Beverly withdraws, feeling it was all a mistake. She has inspired kids at school, and stands up to her bully, getting her suspended. She finally hashes things out with her grandma, inspiring her to talk to Anti. Ellen and Nicky play for her The Kinks "Better Things". Gail finds the mixtape list discarded by Beverly, it inspires her to finally talk about Kim. She brings out a recording of "The Wrong Song", written and sung by her mom. 

The film ends with the three girls performing as Us Dudes R Sisters songs inspired by the mixtape in a New Year's Eve party that includes their three families and Anti (Edward).

Cast
 Julie Bowen as Gail
 Gemma Brooke Allen as Beverly Moody
 Nick Thune as Anti
 Jackson Rathbone as Wes
 Olga Petsa as Nicky Jones
 Audrey Hsieh as Ellen
 Steph Song as Ellen's mother
 Diego Mercado as Steven

Production
In June 2012, it was announced Tom Vaughan would direct the film, from a screenplay by Stacey Menear. In January 2021, Julie Bowen, Gemma Brooke Allen, Nick Thune, Jackson Rathbone, Olga Petsa, Audrey Hsieh and Diego Mercado joined the cast of the film, with Valerie Weiss set to direct the film replacing Vaughn, and Netflix set to distribute.

Principal photography began on February 8, 2021 and concluded on April 9, 2021 in Burnaby, British Columbia.

Release
The film was released on December 3, 2021 via Netflix.

Reception
On review aggregator Rotten Tomatoes, the film holds an approval rating of 100% based on 10 reviews, with an average rating of 7/10.

References

External links
 

American coming-of-age comedy-drama films
Films scored by Tamar-kali
Films shot in British Columbia
2020s coming-of-age comedy-drama films
2020s English-language films
Films directed by Valerie Weiss
2020s American films